Strength is the second studio album by The Alarm, released in 1985 on IRS Records. The single "Strength" was released before the album, reaching #40 on the UK singles chart. This was followed after the album release by "Spirit of '76", which reached #22 and saw the band on Top of the Pops and in various other TV appearances. "Knife Edge" was the final single from the album to be released, just failing to reach the top 40.

The album was initially released on vinyl LP, vinyl picture disc and cassette. As technology improved, a CD version was released.

An extended remastered version was released in 2000, with a revised track listing, B-sides and previously unreleased recordings, plus new and original artwork, photos, lyrics, sleeve notes by Mike Peters and interactive programming information to play the album in its original form.

Alt-Strength is a full set of demos that was released as a double-CD set on 12 November 2001.

Strength 1985-1986 is a remastered double-CD set featuring the original album, unreleased studio sessions, and 12" mixes issued in 2019.

Track listing
All songs written by Eddie Macdonald and Mike Peters, except "Strength", which was written by The Alarm.

"Knife-Edge" - 5:06
"Strength" - 5:34
"Dawn Chorus" - 5:24
"Spirit of '76" - 7:05
"Deeside" - 3:08
"Father to Son" - 4:04
"Only the Thunder" - 4:06
"The Day the Ravens Left the Tower" - 4:45
"Absolute Reality" - 3:24 (Not included on UK version of the album)
"Walk Forever by My Side" - 3:32

Remastered release track listing
"Strength" - 5:34
"Knife Edge" - 5:09
"Spirit of '76" - 7:04
"Walk Forever by My Side" - 3:34
"Father to Son" - 4:05
"Deeside" - 3:10
"Majority" - 3:22
"One Step Closer to Home" (Electric Version) - 4:28
"Caroline Isenberg" - 2:41
"Dawn Chorus" - 5:25
"Only the Thunder" - 4:42
"The Day the Ravens Left the Tower" - 4:46
"Absolute Reality" - 3:31
"Where Were You When the Storm Broke?" (Live) - 3:30
"Deeside" (Live) - 3:11
"Sixty Eight Guns" (Live) - 6:59
"Knocking on Heaven's Door" (Live) - 4:26

Credits
Recorded at Marcus Studios, London, June–July 1985.

Band members
Mike Peters - vocals
David Sharp - guitars
Eddie MacDonald - bass
Nigel Twist - drums

Additional musician
Rupert Black - keyboards

Production
Mike Howlett - producer, mixing
Nigel Luby - engineer, mixing

Alt-Strength
Alt-Strength is a double CD that includes demos and warm-up covers from the Strength recording sessions.

Track listing

Disc 1
Nov. 29th-30th 1984 E-Zee Hire Demos

"Knife Edge"
"Absolute Reality"
"Sons of Divorce"
"One Step Closer to Home"
"Rose Beyond the Wall"
"Steeltown (Deeside)"
"We Are Majority"
"Black Side of Fortune"
"The Day the Ravens Left the Tower"

April 4, 1985 Roundhouse, London Jam Session

"Get It On" (T. Rex cover)
"Summertime Blues" (Eddie Cochran cover)
"Gimme All Your Lovin'" (ZZ Top cover)
"Alarm Alarm" (Toilets/17 cover)
"Radar Love" (Golden Earring cover)
"Burn" (Deep Purple cover)
"Black Night" (Deep Purple cover)
"You Can't Always Get What You Want" (Rolling Stones cover)
"Walk on the Wild Side" (Lou Reed cover)
"Vicious" (Lou Reed cover)
"All Right Now" (Free cover)
"Communication Breakdown" (Led Zeppelin cover)
"It's in the Charts"
"Maggie May/Maggie's Farm/Stand Down Margaret" (Rod Stewart/Bob Dylan/The Beat cover)

April 4–10, 1985 Roundhouse Demos/Mixes

"Dawn Chorus"
"Knife Edge"

Disc 2
May 10, 1985: Birmingham Odeon Sound Check

"Give Me Love (Strength)"

May 17, 1985 Pluto Studios Recording Sessions

"In the Cold Light of Day"

June/July 1985: Main Recording Sessions, Marcus Studios

"River Still to Cross"

June 27, 1985 Rough Mixes

"Strength"
"Spirit of '76"
"Deeside"
"For Tomorrow (Father to Son)"
"Majority"
"Absolute Reality"
"One Step Closer to Home"
"Only the Thunder"
"Day the Ravens Left the Tower"
"Walk Forever by My Side"

July 15, 1985 Marcus Studios Rough Mixes

"Strength"
"Spirit of '76"

References

1985 albums
The Alarm albums
Albums produced by Mike Howlett
I.R.S. Records albums